Flowery Field railway station serves the Flowery Field area of Hyde, Greater Manchester, England. The station is managed by Northern Trains.

The station was opened in 1985 and is mainly a wooden structure, similar in design to Godley railway station, which is also on the Glossop Line.  The station was opened by British Rail.

As part of the failed Manchester TIF bid,  the station would have been refurbished with CCTV, real-time passenger information and additional seating and shelters.  The bid failed after residents of Greater Manchester voted against the congestion charge. However, funding was secured from Transport for Greater Manchester in 2011, for the installation of CCTV, Customer Information Screens, a Public Announcement System and Help Points.

Services
There is a half-hourly daily service to Manchester Piccadilly and to Hadfield (with extra trains during weekday peak periods). Trains operate hourly during the evening.

References

External links

Railway stations in Tameside
DfT Category F2 stations
Railway stations opened by British Rail
Railway stations in Great Britain opened in 1985
Northern franchise railway stations
Hyde, Greater Manchester